John Moonan Fitzgerald (January 20, 1923 – June 16, 2008) was an American politician and jurist.

Born in Rochester, Minnesota, Fitzgerald served in the United States Army Air Forces as a pilot during World War II. He had gone to Rochester Community College and Michigan State University. Fitzgerald received his bachelor's degree and law degrees from University of Minnesota and practiced law in New Prague, Minnesota. He was the New Prague city attorney from 1950 to 1955. Fitzgerald served in the Minnesota House of Representatives from 1957 to 1962 as a Democrat. He served as Minnesota state district judge from 1963 until his retirement in 1993.

Notes

1923 births
2008 deaths
Politicians from Rochester, Minnesota
United States Army Air Forces pilots of World War II
Michigan State University alumni
University of Minnesota alumni
University of Minnesota Law School alumni
Minnesota state court judges
Democratic Party members of the Minnesota House of Representatives
20th-century American judges
People from New Prague, Minnesota
20th-century American politicians
Military personnel from Minnesota